Cass Township is one of the seventeen townships of Hancock County, Ohio, United States. As of the 2010 census the population was 993, down from 1,098 at the 2000 census.

Geography
Located in the northern part of the county, it borders the following townships:
Bloom Township, Wood County - north
Perry Township, Wood County - northeast corner
Washington Township - east
Biglick Township - southeast corner
Marion Township - south
Allen Township - west

No municipalities are located in Cass Township.

Name and history
Statewide, other Cass Townships are located in Muskingum and Richland counties.

Cass Township was organized in 1833. It was named for Lewis Cass, who had then recently served as Territorial Governor of Michigan.

Government
The township is governed by a three-member board of trustees, who are elected in November of odd-numbered years to a four-year term beginning on the following January 1. Two are elected in the year after the presidential election and one is elected in the year before it. There is also an elected township fiscal officer, who serves a four-year term beginning on April 1 of the year after the election, which is held in November of the year before the presidential election. Vacancies in the fiscal officership or on the board of trustees are filled by the remaining trustees.

References

External links

Townships in Hancock County, Ohio
Townships in Ohio